Davenant Foundation School is a Christian Ecumenical secondary school, founded in 1680, currently in Loughton, Essex, England.

History

Foundation in Whitechapel
In February 1680 the Reverend Ralph Davenant, rector of St Mary's Whitechapel, drew up his will, leaving all of his household goods and plate to his wife with the provision that it should eventually be sold and that the monies raised should be used to build a school for 40 boys of Whitechapel in the East End of London.

In addition to this bequest, a number of properties were also given over to the school so that rents and capital could be raised. These consisted of a farm at Sandon near Chelmsford, the site of Tilbury Fort and land on which the London, Tilbury and Southend Railway was built. Funds raised thereby went towards the additional educating of 34 poor girls. Boys were to learn reading, writing and arithmetic, whilst the girls were to learn reading, writing and sewing.

A site for the proposed school was found in the Whitechapel Road on the Lower Burial Ground. The old school buildings still stand there.

In 1813, Davenant earned itself the title of 'Cradle of the National Schools of England'.

Monitorial system
Dr Andrew Bell invented a system for educating hundreds of children with only one Master assisted by senior boys. This became known as the monitorial system. 1,000 children (600 boys and 400 girls) were educated by this system in a new building which was erected in Davenant Street.

The charity school continued to function in the original buildings which were eventually enlarged in 1818 to accommodate 100 boys and 100 girls. The school by now maintained two institutions educating 1,200 children – extraordinarily large for 1818. The third strand of the school came into being in 1858 when a Commercial or Grammar School was built in Leman Street under the direction of the Reverend Welden Champneys, the then Rector of Whitechapel. In 1888 the two charities of Whitechapel and Davenant merged to become 'The Foundation School'.

New buildings
In 1896, the new Renaissance Building was erected behind the 1818 building providing additional classroom space and an assembly hall which remains. In 1939 the school was evacuated and the buildings were taken over by the Heavy Rescue Service. In 1944 the school became Davenant Foundation Grammar School for Boys, a title which it retained until 1980. By then it educated only some 200 boys.

Move to Loughton
In 1965, at the invitation of the Essex County Council, the school moved to the suburb of Loughton.

Comprehensive and coeducational school
The school continued as a two-form entry boys' grammar school until 1980. In that year Her Majesty Queen Elizabeth the Queen Mother made her second visit to the school, to celebrate 300 years since its founding. The school returned to co-educational status and developed as a Christian Ecumenical School for 1,000 girls and boys. The school also gained specialist status as a Language College and a Sports College.

Academy
The school converted to academy status on 1 April 2011.

Television
Davenant students appeared on Channel 4's Teens programme in 2015.

House system 
A new house system was introduced in 2005 with the school being divided up into six houses, one for each form in each year. The houses are named after places in the school's surrounding area.

The houses were:
 Debden - Mascot: Dragons - Colour: Red
 Abbey - Mascot: Angels - - Colour: Blue
 Valley (after Roding Valley) - Mascot: Lions - Colour: Yellow
 Epping - Mascot: Tigers - Colour: yellow
 Nazeing - Mascot: Shark - Colour: Purple
 Theydon (after Theydon Bois) - Mascot: Phoenix - Colour: Green

The initial letters of the house names were D, A, V, E, N, T; which are the letters that make up the school's name - Davenant (minus the repeated letters). Each house had a mascot, house colour, sixth form house prefects, and a member of staff as head of house.

In 2019, the house system was changed. The houses stayed as individual form groups, while three new houses were introduced. The houses are:

 Gillingham - With forms D and E in this house
 Salisbury - With forms A and N in this house
 Whitechapel - With forms V and T in this house

These houses are named after significant places in Davenant's history.

Rugby 

The school has been on four rugby tours so far; Canada, New Zealand, South Africa and South America. On the tour to South Africa the team won 3 matches out of 5; while on this tour Davenant played a team which came from the local townships. The Canada tour in 1994 was more successful as all 5 games were won.

Notable former pupils and staff
 James Brokenshire, Conservative MP for Hornchurch since 2005. He was appointed the Northern Ireland Secretary in July 2016 in Theresa May's cabinet.
 Sir Samuel Goldman , civil servant and banker
 Phil Piratin, Communist MP for Mile End from 1945 to 1950
 Sir Martin Roth, Professor of Psychiatry at the University of Cambridge from 1977 to 1985 and president of the Royal College of Psychiatrists from 1971 to 1975
 Leslie Solley, Labour MP for Thurrock from 1945 to 1950 (expelled from the Labour Party in 1949 for opposing the North Atlantic Treaty)
 Carl Jenkinson, Charlton Athletic, Arsenal and West Ham United footballer, 2003–10
 Naomi Scott, actress, singer and musician, star of Aladdin
 James Bransgrove, Colchester United footballer

Cycling event
The school was the start and end point for the 2017 London–Edinburgh–London cycle ride.

See also 
 Davenant International
 Davenant Centre
  The History of the Davenant Foundation Grammar School by Roland R. Reynolds, M.A., Former Headmaster
  The Davenant Foundation Grammar School: The War Years 1939 - 1945. Edited by Arnold A. Zimmerman. . (LCCN 00-13242)

References 

 Ofsted reports on Davenant Foundation School

External links 
 Davenant Foundation School Official School website
  old boys' memories site

Educational institutions established in the 1680s
1680 establishments in England
Academies in Essex
Secondary schools in Essex
Loughton
Relocated schools